Florian Buchacher (born 28 September 1987) is an Austrian football player.

Club career
He made his Austrian Football First League debut for WSG Wattens on 22 July 2016 in a game against FC Blau-Weiß Linz.

References

External links
 

1987 births
Sportspeople from Innsbruck
Footballers from Tyrol (state)
Living people
Austrian footballers
WSG Tirol players
FC Wacker Innsbruck (2002) players
Austrian Football Bundesliga players
2. Liga (Austria) players
Austrian Regionalliga players
Association football defenders